This is a list of largest UK trade book publishers, with some of their principal imprints, ranked by sales value.

List
According to Nielsen BookScan as of 2010 the largest book publishers of the United Kingdom were:
   

 Penguin Random House £409.9m (23.4%)
 Penguin: Penguin, Hamish Hamilton, Allen Lane, Michael Joseph, Viking, Rough Guides, Dorling Kindersley, Puffin, Ladybird, Warne
 Random House: Random House, Century, Hutchinson, William Heinemann, Arrow; Chatto & Windus, Jonathan Cape, Harvill Secker, Vintage, Pimlico, Bodley Head; Transworld, Doubleday, Bantam Press, Black Swan, Bantam, Corgi; Ebury Press, BBC Books; Virgin Books, Black Lace, Nexus, Cheek; Andersen Press
 Hachette Livre (UK)  £287.9m (16.4%)
 Headline; Hodder & Stoughton, Sceptre, Quercus;  Little, Brown, Abacus, Sphere, Piatkus, Orbit, Virago; Orion, Weidenfeld & Nicolson, Gollancz, Phoenix, Everyman; John Murray; Octopus, Cassell, Hamlyn, Mitchell Beazley, Philips; Orion Children's Books, Hodder Children’s Books, Orchard Books, Franklin Watts, Wayland, Hodder Education, Chambers Harrap
 HarperCollins £132.3m (7.6%)
 HarperCollins, 4th Estate, Avon, Voyager, Collins, HarperPress, Blue Door, Harper North
 Pan Macmillan £57.3m (3.3%)
 Pan Books, Picador, Macmillan New Writing, Macmillan, Boxtree, Sidgwick and Jackson, Tor (UK), Kingfisher
 Pearson Education £40.7m (2.3%)
 Oxford University Press £37.6m (2.1%)
 Bloomsbury £35.6m (2.0%)
 Bloomsbury, A&C Black
 Simon & Schuster £27.2m (1.6%)
 John Wiley & Sons (UK) £26.7m (1.5%)
 Faber Independent Alliance £57.4m (3.3%)
 Faber & Faber, Atlantic Books, Canongate, Granta Books, Icon Books, Portobello Books, Profile Books (including Serpent's Tail), Short Books. A number of financially independent smaller publishers that have formed an alliance to share promotion and administration, led by Faber.

Historical comparisons 
{| class="wikitable sortable"
|-bgcolor="#cccccc"
! # 
! Company 
! Sales 2010
!
! Sales 2009  
!  
! Sales 2008
 
!  
! Sales 2007
!  
! Sales 2006 
!  
! Sales 2005 
! 
|-
| 1  || Hachette Livre (UK)  || £m || (15.2%)|| £287.9m || (16.4%) || £282.5m || (15.9%) || £299.8m || (16.6%) || £277.3m || (16.4%) || £206.1m || (12.5%) 
|-
| 2  || Random House (UK)  || £m || (13.8%)|| £239.4m || (13.7%) || £262.7m || (14.8%) || £263.4m || (14.6%) || £261.0m || (15.4%) || £229.9m || (14.0%)  
|-
| 3  || Penguin Books  || £195.3m || (11.5%)|| £170.5m || (9.7%) || £177.2m || (10.0%) || £177.3m || (9.8%) || £180.6m || (10.7%) || £174.9m || (10.6%) 
|-
| 4  || HarperCollins  || £120.9m || (7.1%)|| £132.3m || (7.6%) || £147.5m || (8.3%) || £142.7m || (7.9%) || £141.6m || (8.4%) || £134.8m || (8.2%) 
|-
| 5  || Pan Macmillan || £60.9m || (3.6%)|| £57.3m || (3.3%) ||  £57.9m || (3.3%) ||  £61.4m || (3.4%) || £53.2m || (3.1%) || £54.8m || (3.3%) 
|-
| 6  || Pearson Education  || £40.7m || (2.3%) || £42.2m || (2.4%) || £32.3m || (1.8%) || £34.0m || (2.0%) || £32.6m || (2.0%) || ||
|-
| 7  || Bloomsbury  || £m || (2.1%)|| £35.6m || (2.0%) || £43.3m || (2.4%) || £74.7m || (4.2%) || £31.1m || (1.8%) || £62.3m || (3.8%)
|-
| 8  || Oxford University Press  || £m || (2.0%)|| £37.6m || (2.1%) || £34.5m || (1.9%) || £33.1m || (1.8%) || £33.1m || (2.0%) || £30.9m || (1.9%) 
|-
| 9  || Simon & Schuster  || £31.1m || (1.8%)|| £27.2m || (1.6%) || £24.9m  || (1.4%)  || £26.9m || (1.5%) || £23.9m || (1.4%) || £24.3m || (1.5%) 
|-
| 10  || John Wiley & Sons  || £26.7m || (1.5%) || £27m || (1.5%) ||  ||  ||  ||  ||  || || || 
|-
|  || Egmont  || £24.9m || (1.4%) || £27m || (1.5%) || £24.9m || (1.4%) || £22.9m || (1.4%) ||  ||   || ||
|-
|   || Elsevier ||  ||  ||  ||  || £23.0m || (1.4%) || £21.4m || (1.3%) || ||  || ||
|-class="sortbottom"
| || Faber Alliance || £m || (3.9%)|| £57.4m || (3.3%) || £47.5m || (2.7%) || £39.1m || (2.2%) || £41.4m || (2.4%) ||  ||
|}

See also
 Books in the United Kingdom
 Book trade in the United Kingdom

References

External links
 2009 figures and analysis, The Bookseller
 Tom Tivnan, Half-year review 2011: publisher performance, The Bookseller, 8 July 2011

Book Largest
Uk Largest Book
Book publishers, largest
Largest Book